Anisha Ambrose is an Indian actress and model who appears in Telugu films. In 2013, she made her debut with Alias Janaki.

Early career
Anisha's parents are from Visakhapatnam and she grew up in Odisha. Her family runs several schools in Andhra Pradesh and Odisha. She pursued her education from St. Josephs College for Women in Visakhapatnam and completed her MBA in finance at GITAM School of International Business.

She modelled for a friend's photography page on Facebook and her pictures were noticed by producer Neelima Tirumalasetti, from where her film career started.

Personal life 
Ambrose married Hyderabad-based entrepreneur Gunanath Jakka in May 2019 and subsequently quit acting. The couple had a child in 2020.

Filmography
 All films are in Telugu, unless otherwise noted.

References

External links
 

Living people
Actresses from Visakhapatnam
21st-century Indian actresses
Indian film actresses
Actresses in Telugu cinema
Actresses in Kannada cinema
Actresses in Malayalam cinema
Actresses in Tamil cinema
Year of birth missing (living people)